The 571st Anti-Submarine Aviation Squadron (Serbo-Croatian:  / 571. противподморничка а авијацијска ескадрила) was an aviation squadron of Yugoslav Air Force established at Mostar airport in April, 1961.

It was part of 97th Support Aviation Regiment and equipped with domestic-made twin-engine anti-submarine aircraft, Ikarus 214PP.

Squadron was disbanded in 1964.

Assignments
97th Support Aviation Regiment (1961-1964)

Bases stationed
Mostar (1961-1964)

Equipment
Ikarus 214PP (1961–1964)

References

Yugoslav Air Force squadrons
Military units and formations established in 1961